Gardner House is a historic home located at Guilderland in Albany County, New York.  It was built about 1875 and is a two-story Second Empire style farmhouse with a mansard roof and dormers. It features a one-story porch with carved and sawn brackets. Also on the property is a smoke house.

It was listed on the National Register of Historic Places in 1982.

References

Houses on the National Register of Historic Places in New York (state)
Houses completed in 1875
Second Empire architecture in New York (state)
Houses in Albany County, New York
National Register of Historic Places in Albany County, New York